Richard "Sam" Eglington (1 April 1908 – 20 March 1979) was an English cricketer. Eglington was a right-handed batsman. He was born at Esher, Surrey, and was educated at Sherborne School.

Eglington first represented the Surrey Second XI in the 1927 Minor Counties Championship, making two appearances against the Kent Second XI and Buckinghamshire. He next appeared for the Surrey Second XI in the 1938 Minor Counties Championship, in the same season in which he made his first-class debut for Surrey against Derbyshire at Queen's Park, Chesterfield, in the County Championship. He made a second first-class appearance for the county in that same season against Cambridge University at The Oval. He didn't feature for Surrey in 1939, instead playing for the county's Second XI in the Minor Counties Championship, which allowed him to be selected for a combined Minor Counties cricket team, making a single first-class appearance for the team in 1939 against the touring West Indians at Lord's. In a match which was drawn, he scored 23 runs in the Minor Counties only innings, before being dismissed by Learie Constantine.

He died at Winchester, Hampshire, on 20 March 1979.

References

External links
Richard Eglington at ESPNcricinfo
Richard Eglington at CricketArchive

1908 births
1979 deaths
People from Esher
People educated at Sherborne School
English cricketers
Surrey cricketers
Minor Counties cricketers